Kadri Kimsen (born 8 October 1976) is an Estonian former footballer who played as a midfielder for the Estonia women's national team.

Career
Kimsen played in the first ever official match for Estonia, against Lithuania. In total, she played for the Estonia national team 10 times between 1994 and 2001, playing alongside her younger sister Kaire Kimsen on eight of those occasions. Kaire and Kadri Kimsen were the first pair of sisters to represent the Estonian national football team.

Personal life
Her daughter, Marie Heleen Lisette Kikkas, is also an Estonian international footballer and debuted in December 2020.

References

1976 births
Living people
Women's association football midfielders
Estonian women's footballers
Estonia women's international footballers
People from Saue Parish